Highspeed Hayride is an American country music band established in 2002 in Goliad, Texas. The band consists of Eugene Moreno III on lead vocals and rhythm guitars, Shelby David Stockton, Jr. on bass guitar and harmony vocals, Matthew Groll on drums and Bo Carter on lead guitar and harmony vocals. Highspeed Hayride has released three independent albums including "Lights of Town" (2004), "Thought You Should Know" (2006) and the self-titled album "Highspeed Hayride" (2008). Highspeed Hayride has shared the stage with many of their childhood heroes as well as their Texas Country comrades. Some artists the band has shared the stage with include: The Bellamy Brothers, Little Texas, John Conlee, Earl Thomas Conley, David Allan Coe, Robert Earl Keen, Shooter Jennings, George Strait, Kevin Fowler, Pat Green, Randy Rogers, and many more. Highspeed Hayride played their farewell show in May 2010.  Some members of the band continue to play on....

Discography

Albums

Singles
In 2006, "Thought You Should Know" (produced by Mike McClure, formerly of The Great Divide (band)) spawned two Texas Music Chart Singles. The first, a revamped version of the Eddie Rabbitt song "Drivin' My Life Away scored top 40 chart position peaking at No. 34. The second single, "Get Out of My Way" (EM3, BMI), penned by lead singer Gene Moreno reached No. 30 on the Texas Music Chart.

In 2008, Highspeed Hayride went to Austin, Texas' Bismeaux Studio, owned by front man of Asleep at the Wheel, Ray Benson to record their third independent album, the self-titled "Highspeed Hayride". The group enlisted friend and fellow musician Billy Jo High to produce and play lead guitar on the album. The first single, "Boots" claimed the No. 19 spot on the Texas Music Chart with a follow up single soon to follow.

Quotes 

"Highspeed Hayride's sound is so fresh and new, these tunes would fit nicely on any country radio station. They sound great!"
Rondal Huckaby
Keyboards, George Strait's Ace in the Hole Band

“Highspeed Hayride is absolutely the real deal”
Gary P. Nunn

“This is most defiantly the band to keep an eye peeled for.  When Highspeed came to town everyone knew it.  Fresh sound and great harmonies; catch them once and you’ll be hooked!”
Michael Tucker, Drums-The Bellamy Brothers

“Highspeed Hayride puts everything they’ve got into everything they do and it shows. Check them out once, and you’re hooked.  I added HH a couple of months ago and the response had been huge!”
JR Schumann-KIXS 107.9 FM, Victoria, TX
 
“Highspeed Hayride has come a long way in few short years.  I’ve been impressed with the way their sound has developed and I think they will soon be headlining shows at venues all over Texas and beyond!”
Frank Edwards-KRYS 99.1 FM, Corpus Christi, TX

Media 

Country music groups from Texas
Musical groups established in 2002
2002 establishments in Texas